The Branded Sombrero is a 1928 American silent adventure film directed by Lambert Hillyer and written by Lambert Hillyer and James Kevin McGuinness. The film stars Buck Jones, Leila Hyams, Jack Baston, Stanton Heck, Francis Ford and Josephine Borio. The film was released on January 8, 1928, by Fox Film Corporation.

Cast
Buck Jones as Starr Hallett
Leila Hyams as Connie Marsh
Jack Baston as Charles Maggert
Stanton Heck as Honest John Hallett
Francis Ford as Link Jarvis
Josephine Borio as Rosa
Lew Kelly as Lane Hallett

References

External links 
 

1928 films
Fox Film films
American adventure films
1928 adventure films
Films directed by Lambert Hillyer
American black-and-white films
American silent feature films
1920s English-language films
1920s American films
Silent adventure films